Queen Jeonghui (Hangul: 정희왕후, Hanja: 貞熹王后; 8 December 1418 – 6 May 1483), of the Papyeong Yun clan, was a posthumous name bestowed on the wife and queen of Yi Yu, King Sejo. She was Queen of Joseon from 1455 until her husband's death in 1468, after which she was honoured as Queen Dowager Jaseong (자성왕대비) during the reign of her son, Yi Hwang, King Yejong, and as Grand Queen Dowager Jaseong (자성대왕대비) during the reign of her grandson, Yi Hyeol, King Seongjong.

Lady Yun was the first Joseon royal consort to receive the title of Grand Queen Dowager. She also served as regent for her young grandson between 1468-1476 with her daughter-in-law, Queen Dowager Insu as adviser, after the sudden death of Yejong in 1469.

Biography

Early life and marriage
The future Queen Jeonghui was born on 8 December 1418 during the eighteenth year of King Taejong's reign as the 9th child within 10 siblings. Her father was Yun Beon, who would later become Chief State Councillor, and her mother was Lady Yi of the Incheon Yi clan. 

Through her great-great-grandfather, Yun Ahn-suk, Queen Jeonghui was a first cousin thrice removed of Royal Consort Hui-bi of the Papyeong Yun clan, who was the consort of King Chunghye of Goryeo. Royal Consort Hui-bi was also a first cousin once removed of Queen Wongyeong as her mother, Lady Min of the Yeoheung Min clan, was the younger sister of the Queen's grandfather. Through her brothers, Queen Jeonghui eventually became a first cousin thrice removed of Queen Jeonghyeon, the great-grandaunt of Queen Janggyeong and Yun Im, and the 3rd great-grandaunt of Queen Munjeong and Yun Won-hyeong. 

Through her maternal grandfather, Queen Jeonghui was also a great-grandniece of Royal Consort Geun-bi of the Goseong Yi clan, who was the consort of King U of Goryeo.

She later married Grand Prince Suyang at the age of ten in 1428, on the thirteenth day of the twelfth lunar month in the tenth year of King Sejong's reign. She was given the titles of Grand Princess Consort Samhanguk (삼한국대부인, 三韓國大夫人) and eventually, Grand Internal Princess Consort Nakrang (낙랑부대부인, 樂浪府大夫人).

Lady Yun became Queen upon her husband's accession to the throne in 1455, after a coup d'état against his nephew, King Danjong.

Regency
In 1469, King Yejong died suddenly at the age of 20, and was succeeded by his youngest nephew and Queen Jeonghui's grandson, Prince Jalsan, who was third in the line of succession to the throne, rather than his own son, Grand Prince Jean. The official reasons given were that Grand Prince Jean was deemed to young at 4 years old to become King and that Prince Wolsan was too sickly, but the more likely reason for this choice was Jalsan's marriage to the daughter of the powerful Han Myeong-hoe.

As Seongjong was only 13 at the time of his accession, Queen Jeonghui ruled the nation as regent, along with her daughter-in-law and Seongjong's mother, Queen Insu (whose husband had never actually been King). During her regency, common farmers were granted the right to cultivate fields that had originally belonged to the military. In 1474, the code of law, first ordered by King Sejo, was completed and put into effect.

Later life
Queen Jeonghui's regency ended in 1476 and she died on 6 May 1483, in the fourteenth year of King Seongjong's reign.

Family
Father − Yun Beon, Duke Jeongjeong, Internal Prince Papyeong (증 영의정 파평부원군 정정공 윤번, 判中樞 贈 領議政 坡平府院君 貞靖公 尹璠) (1384 - 1448)
 a) Grandfather − Yun Seung-rye (윤승례, 尹承禮) (? - 13 October 1397)
 b) Great-grandfather − Yun Cheok (윤척, 尹陟) (? - 1384)
 c) Great-great-grandfather − Yun Ahn-suk (윤안숙, 尹安淑)
 d) Great-great-great-grandfather − Yun Bo (윤보, 尹珤) (? - 1329)
 d) Great-great-great-grandmother − Lady Park (박씨, 朴氏); daughter of Park Bo (박보, 朴保)
 b) Great-grandmother − Lady Yi of the Jeonui Yi clan (전의이씨)
 a) Grandmother − Lady Gwon of the Andong Gwon clan (안동 권씨, 安東 權氏); Yun Seung-rye’s second wife
 a) Step-grandmother - Princess Gyeongan of the Changnyeong Seong clan (경안택주 창녕 성씨, 慶安宅主 昌寧 成氏)
 Mother − Grand Internal Princess Consort Heungnyeong of the Incheon Yi clan (흥녕부대부인 인천 이씨, 興寧府大夫人 仁川 李氏) (1383 - 1456)
 Grandfather − Yi Mun-hwa, Duke Gongdo (1358 – 1414) (공도공 이문화, 恭度公 李文和)
 Grandmother − Lady Choi of the Chungju Choi clan (충주 최씨, 忠州 崔氏)

Sibling(s)

6 older sisters, 2 older brothers, 1 younger brother
 Older sister − Lady Yun of the Papyeong Yun clan (파평 윤씨, 坡平 尹氏)
 Brother-in-law - Hong Won-yong, Duke Janggan, Prince Gannyeong (강녕군 장간공 홍원용, 江寧君 章簡公 洪元用) of the Namyang Hong clan (1401? - 1466)
 Older brother − Yun Sa-bun, Duke Yijeong, Prince Paseong (파성군 이정공 윤사분, 坡城君 夷靖公 尹士昐) (1401 - 1471)
 Sister-in-law - Lady Jang of the Deoksu Jang clan (정경부인 덕수 장씨, 貞敬夫人 德水 張氏)
 Nephew − Yun Heum, Duk Gonggan (호조판서 공간공 윤흠, 尹欽)
 Older sister − Lady Yun of the Papyeong Yun clan (정경부인  파평 윤씨, 貞敬夫人 坡平 尹氏)
 Brother-in-law - Seong Bong-jo, Uuijeong, Duke Yangjeong, Internal Prince Changseong (우의정 창성부원군 양정공 성봉조, 右議政 昌成府院君 襄靖公 成奉祖) of the Changnyeong Seong clan (1401 - 1474)
 Nephew − Seong Yul (성율, 成慄)
 Older brother − Yun Sa-yun, Duke Seongan, Prince Yeongpyeong (공조판서 영평군 성안공 윤사윤, 工曹判書 鈴平君 成公安 尹士昀) (1409 - 7 December 1461).
 Sister-in-law - Lady Choi of the Suwon Choi clan (부산현부인 수원 최씨, 釜山縣夫人 水原 崔氏)
 Nephew − Yun Bo (윤보, 尹甫)
 Grandnephew − Yun Yeo-pil (윤여필, 尹汝弼) (1466 - 1555)
 Grandnephew − Yun Yeo-hae (윤여해, 尹汝諧)
 Older sister − Lady Yun of the Papyeong Yun clan (정경부인  파평 윤씨, 貞敬夫人 坡平 尹氏)
 Brother-in-law - Yi Yeon-sun (공조참판 이연손, 工曹參判 李延孫) (? - 1463)
 Older sister − Lady Yun of the Papyeong Yun clan (파평 윤씨, 坡平 尹氏)
 Brother-in-law - Yi Yeom-ui, Duke Horyeo (지중추부사 호려공 이염의, 知中樞府事 胡戾公 李念義) (1409? - 1492)
 Older sister − Lady Yun of the Papyeong Yun clan (파평 윤씨, 坡平 尹氏)
 Brother-in-law - Oh Deok-gi (오덕기, 吳慶基)
 Older sister − Princess Consort Anseong of the Papyeong Yun clan (정경부인 안성군부인 윤씨, 貞敬夫人 安城郡夫人 尹氏)
 Brother-in-law - Han Gye-mi, Duke Munyang, Internal Prince Seowon (서원부원군 문양공 한계미, 西原府院君 文襄公 韓繼美) (1421 - 1471)
 Younger brother − Yun Sa-heun, Duke Yangpyeong, Internal Prince Pacheon (영돈녕 파천부원군 양평공 윤사흔, 領敦寧 坡川府院君 襄平公 尹士昕) (1422 - 1485).
 Sister-in-law - Lady Kim of the Gyerim Kim clan (계림 김씨, 鷄林 金氏)
 Nephew − Yun Suk-gyeom (윤숙겸, 尹叔謙)
 Nephew − Yun Gye-gyeom (윤계겸, 尹繼謙) (1442 - 1483)
 Grandnephew − Yun Ok (윤욱, 尹頊) (1459 - 1485)
 Grandnephew − Yun Rim (윤림, 尹琳)
 Nephew − Yun Yu-ui (윤유의, 尹由義)
 Nephew − Yun Yu-rye (윤유례, 尹由禮)
 Nephew − Yun Yu-ji (윤유지, 尹由智)

Husband

 King Sejo of Joseon (2 November 1417 – 23 September 1468)
 Mother-in-law - Queen Soheon of the Cheongsong Sim clan (12 October 1395 – 19 April 1446) (소헌왕후 심씨)
 Father-in-law - King Sejong of Joseon (15 May 1397 – 8 April 1450) (세종)

Issue

 Son - Yi Jang, Crown Prince Uigyeong (3 October 1438 – 20 September 1457)
 Daughter-in-law - Queen Sohye of the Cheongju Han clan (7 October 1437 – 11 May 1504)
 Grandson − Yi Jeong, Grand Prince Wolsan (5 January 1455 -  22 January 1489)
 Granddaughter-in-law - Grand Internal Princess Consort Seungpyeong of the Suncheon Park clan (1455 - 20 July 1506)
 Granddaughter − Princess Myeongsuk (1456 - 1482)
 Grandson-in-law - Hong Sang (1457 - 1513)
 Grandson − Yi Hyeol, King Seongjong (19 August 1457 - 19 January 1495)
 Granddaughter-in-law - Queen Gonghye of the Cheongju Han clan (8 November 1456 - 30 April 1474)
 Granddaughter-in-law - Queen Jeheon of the Haman Yun clan (15 July 1455 - 29 August 1482)
 Granddaughter-in-law - Queen Jeonghyeon of the Papyeong Yun clan (21 July 1462 - 13 September 1530)
 Daughter - Yi Se-seon, Princess Uisuk (1441 – 1477)
 Son-in-law - Jeong Hyeon-jo (1440 – 13 July 1504) of the Hadong Jeong clan
 Son - Yi Hwang, King Yejong (14 January 1450 – 31 December 1469)
 Daughter-in-law - Queen Jangsun of the Cheongju Han clan (22 February 1445 – 5 January 1462),
 Daughter-in-law - Queen Ansun of the Cheongju Han clan (12 March 1445 – 3 February 1499)
 Daughter - Yi Se-hui, Princess Uiryeong or Princess Uihwa.
 Son-in-law - Kim Cha-dong

See also 
 Royal Consort Hui-bi of the Papyeong Yun clan - a concubine of King Chunghye of Goryeo and Jeonghui’s ancestor
 Queen Jeonghyeon - Queen Jeonghui’s descendant 
 Queen Janggyeong- Queen Jeonghui’s descendant 
 Queen Munjeong - Queen Jeonghui’s descendant 
 Yun Won-hyeong - Queen Jeonghui’s descendant

In popular culture
 Portrayed by Jung Hye-sun in the 1984-1985 MBC TV series The Ume Tree in the Midst of the Snow
 Portrayed by Choi Ran in the 1990 KBS TV series Dance Toward the Broken Heavens (파천무)
 Portrayed by Hong Se-mi in the 1994 KBS TV series Han Myeong-hoe
 Portrayed by Han Hye-sook in the 1998-2000 KBS TV series King and Queen.
Portrayed by Yang Mi-kyung in the 2007-2008 SBS TV series The King and I.
 Portrayed by Kim Seo-ra in the 2011 KBS2 TV series The Princess' Man.
 Portrayed by Kim Mi-sook in the 2011-2012 JTBC TV series Insu, The Queen Mother.

References

External links
Korea Heads

1418 births
1483 deaths
15th-century women rulers
Regents of Korea
Royal consorts of the Joseon dynasty
Korean queens consort
15th-century Korean women
People from Gangwon Province, South Korea
Papyeong Yun clan